A cereal box prize, also known as a cereal box toy in the UK and Ireland, is a form of advertising that involves using a promotional toy or small item that is offered as an incentive to buy a particular breakfast cereal. Prizes are found inside or sometimes on the cereal box. The term "cereal box prize" is sometimes used as a broader term to also include premiums that can be ordered through the mail from an advertising promotion printed on the outside of the cereal box.

Distribution
Cereal box prizes and premiums have been distributed in four ways. The first, not frequently used now, was an in-store (or point-of-sale) prize that was handed to the customer with the purchase of one or more specified boxes of cereal. The second method of distribution is to include the prize in the box itself, usually outside the liner bag—often called an "in-pack promotion" in retail marketing.  The third method is attaching the prize to the box - "on-pack" promotion - (as with plastic records laminated to the back of the box) or printing the prize on the box (as with numerous games and trading cards) or simply attaching the prize to the box with tape or shrink wrap. Some prizes include a gameboard or other interactive activity printed on the box that corresponds with the prize inside the box, which is used as a gamepiece. The fourth method of distribution is to have the consumer mail in the UPC proof-of-purchase labels cut from a specified number of boxes, sometimes with a cheque or money order to defray the cost of shipping, and the premium is sent to the consumer by mail (rarely first-class), usually from a third-party source.

History
W.K. Kellogg was the first to introduce prizes in boxes of cereal. The marketing strategy that he established has produced thousands of different cereal box prizes that have been distributed by the tens of billions.

The first cereal prize and premium
Kellogg's Corn Flakes had the first breakfast cereal prize. The Funny Jungleland Moving Pictures Book was given to customers in the stores by merchants at the time of purchase of two packages of Kellogg's Corn Flakes. In 1909, Kellogg's changed the book give-away to a premium mail-in offer for the cost of a dime. By 1912, Kellogg's had distributed 2.5 million Jungleland books. The book underwent various edition changes and was last offered to consumers in 1937.

U.S. cereal box prizes
Other manufacturers of major brands of cereal (including General Mills, Malt-O-Meal, Nabisco, Nestlé, Post Foods, and Quaker Oats) followed suit and inserted prizes into boxes of cereal to promote sales and brand loyalty.

Kellogg's Company Prizes
In 1945, Kellogg inserted a prize in the form of pin-back buttons into each box of Pep cereal. Pep pins have included U.S. Army squadrons as well as characters from newspaper comics. There were five series of comic characters and eighteen different buttons in each set, with a total of ninety in the collection.  Kellogg’s 3D Baseball and Football Cards produced by Optigraphics were a big hit from 1970 to 1983 in packages of Kellogg's cereals, initially Corn Flakes and later other brands. A popular and collectable series was Crater Critters.

British cereal box prizes
Among the gifts in British cereal boxes were: baking powder submarines, cartesian divers, miniature sharks with rotating tails powered by rubber bands, catamarans powered by small balloons, and collecting cards.

Technical advances
The invention of a screw injection molding machine by American inventor James Watson Hendry in 1946 changed the world of cereal box prizes. Thermoplastics could be used to produce toys much more rapidly, and much more cheaply, because recycled plastic could be remolded using this process. In addition, injection molding for plastics required much less cool-down time for the toys, because the plastic is not completely melted before injected into the molds. Hendry also developed the first gas-assisted injection molding process in the 1970s, which permitted the production of complex, hollow prizes that cooled quickly. This greatly improved design flexibility as well as the strength and finish of manufactured parts while reducing production time, cost, weight, and waste.

Nostalgia and media

In the U.S.
A 1974 article characterized cereal prizes of the 1950s as "Captain Midnight secret-decoder rings and.. baking soda-powered frogmen", whose arrival by mail, children waited for "impatiently". In 1959, columnist Tom Harris of the West Virginia Gazette-Mail lamented the passing of the send-in box-top prize in place of the in-box prize. The column humorously noted the family battles over cereal purchases which the in-box prizes instigated. In late 1974, the Federal Trade Commission considered banning television commercials which promoted cereal box prizes as a means of selling cereal.

In 1996, General Mills distributed the PC video game Chex Quest on CD in boxes of Chex cereal. It was a total conversion based on id software's Doom engine.

See also
 Baking powder submarine

References

Bibliography

External links
 Cereal Box Archive

Marketing techniques
Customer loyalty programs
Collecting
Breakfast cereals